Superscription may refer to:
something written on a surface, see epigraphy
writing on a cover or envelope
Address (geography)
Book cover
headers in the Book of Psalms, see Psalms#Superscriptions

See also
Page header
Lead paragraph
Title
Colophon (publishing)